The Centre de services scolaire Pierre-Neveu is serving 5 school districts  located in the Antoine-Labelle Regional County Municipality in the Laurentides region of the Canadian province of Quebec. The board, which was established in 1972, was named after Pierre Neveu, a religious figure in Quebec during the twentieth century.

The school board headquarters are in the École du Sacré-Cœur in Mont-Laurier.

Current issues
The last school board elections take place on Sunday, November 2, 2014. The position of chairman has been chosen by universal suffrage. This is for a three-year term. The school board elections before this took place in 2007.

Schools

Secondary schools
 École Polyvalente Saint-Joseph, including the main École Saint-Joseph and Le Pavillon (two campuses in Mont-Laurier)

Primary and secondary schools
École du Méandre - L'Annonciation, Rivière-Rouge

Primary schools
They are ordered by region:
École de la Madone et de la Carrière (all campuses in Mont-Laurier)
École de la Carrière (regional office)
École de la Madone
École de Ferme-Neuve et des Rivières 
École du Sacré-Cœur (regional office, at Ferme-Neuve)
École de Notre-Dame-du-Saint-Sacrement (Ferme-Neuve)
École du Sacré-Cœur (Mont-Saint-Michel)
École de Sainte-Anne (Sainte-Anne-du-Lac)
École de la Lièvre-Sud
École de l'Amitié (regional office, Notre-Dame-du-Laus)
École de Notre-Dame (Notre-Dame-de-Pontmain)
École aux Quatre Vents 
École Notre-Dame (regional office, in Lac-des-Écorces)
École de Saint-Gérard (Kiamika)
École de Saint-François (Lac-des-Écorces)
École de Saint-Joseph (Lac-des-Écorces)
École Henri-Bourassa (Chute-Saint-Philippe)
École du Val-des-Lacs (all campuses in Mont-Laurier)
 École de Saint-Jean-l'Évangéliste (regional office)
 École de Saint-Joachim 
 École des Trois Sentiers
École du Saint-Rosaire (regional office, in Nominingue)
École de l'Aventure (L'Ascension)
École du Christ-Roi (Sainte-Veronique sector of Rivière-Rouge)
École Jean-XXIII (all campuses in Mont-Laurier)
École Jean-XXIII (regional office)
École du Sacré-Cœur 
École Saint-Eugène (Mont-Laurier)

External links
Commission scolaire Pierre-Neveu

References

School districts in Quebec